Commonwealth Christian Academy Foundation Inc. (also called "CCAFI" or simply "the CCA") is an institution of higher learning (high school) located at 185 IBP Road, Brgy. Commonwealth, Quezon City, Philippines. The high school is affiliated with the Seventh-day Adventist Church and holds an autonomous status recognized by CHED (Commission on Higher Education). It was established by Leonor Z. "Mommy" Ostil in 1991.

References

External links
Commonwealth Christian Academy | Facebook

High schools in Metro Manila
Protestant schools in the Philippines
Schools in Quezon City
Educational institutions established in 1991
1991 establishments in the Philippines